The James Baronetcy, of Park Farm Place in Eltham in the County of Kent, was created in the Baronetage of Great Britain on 27 August 1778 for the naval commander William James. The title became extinct on the death of the second Baronet in 1792.

James baronets, of Park Farm Place, Eltham (1778)
Sir William James, 1st Baronet (c. 1721–1783)
Sir Edward William James, 2nd Baronet (c. 1774–1792)

Notes

Extinct baronetcies in the Baronetage of Great Britain
1778 establishments in England